Shunichiro Sato (佐藤 俊一郎) is a Japanese male volleyball player. He currently plays in Tokai University and a member of Japan men's national volleyball team. He used to be part of Japan U21 & U19 national team.

Career
Shunichiro Sato was first registered as member of Japan men's national volleyball team when he was senior student in high school in 2018.

Shunichiro Sato was a member of Japan men's national under-19 volleyball team to participate in 2017 Asian Boys' U19 Volleyball Championship and rewarded as Best Middle Blocker.

On 6 October 2022, JTEKT Stings announced Informal players for Season 2022-2023. Shunichiro Sato was on the list.

National teams 
 Japan men's national under-19 volleyball team (2017–2018)
2017 Asian Boys' U19 Volleyball Championship -  Champion
2017 FIVB Volleyball Boys' U19 World Championship -   3rd place
 Japan men's national under-21 volleyball team (2017)
2017 FIVB Volleyball Men's U21 World Championship- 13th place
2018 Asian Men's U20 Volleyball Championship - 13th place
 Japan men's national under-23 volleyball team (2019)
2019 Asian Men's U23 Volleyball Championship -  3rd place
 Japan universiade national team
 2019 Summer Universiade Tournament - 5th place
 Japan men's national volleyball team (2018, 2020–present)
 2018 Asian Games - 5th place

Awards

Individual 
 2017 Asian Boys' U19 Volleyball Championship — Best Middle Blocker

References

Japanese men's volleyball players
2000 births
Living people